Max Noether (24 September 1844 – 13 December 1921) was a German mathematician who worked on algebraic geometry and the theory of algebraic functions. He has been called "one of the finest mathematicians of the nineteenth century". He was the father of Emmy Noether.

Biography
Max Noether was born in Mannheim in 1844, to a Jewish family of wealthy wholesale hardware dealers. His grandfather, Elias Samuel, had started the business in Bruchsal in 1797. In 1809 the Grand Duchy of Baden established a "Tolerance Edict", which assigned a hereditary surname to the male head of every Jewish family which did not already possess one. Thus the Samuels became the Noether family, and as part of this Christianization of names, their son Hertz (Max's father) became Hermann. Max was the third of five children Hermann had with his wife Amalia Würzburger.

At 14, Max contracted polio and was afflicted by its effects for the rest of his life. Through self-study, he learned advanced mathematics and entered the University of Heidelberg in 1865. He served on the faculty there for several years, then moved to the University of Erlangen in 1888. While there, he helped to found the field of algebraic geometry.

In 1880 he married Ida Amalia Kaufmann, the daughter of another wealthy Jewish merchant family. Two years later they had their first child, named Amalia ("Emmy") after her mother. Emmy Noether went on to become a central figure in abstract algebra. In 1883 they had a son named Alfred, who later studied chemistry before dying in 1918. Their third child, Fritz Noether, was born in 1884, and like Emmy, found prominence as a mathematician; he was executed in the Soviet Union in 1941. Little is known about their fourth child, Gustav Robert, born in 1889; he suffered from continual illness and died in 1928.

Noether served as an Ordinarius (full professor) at Erlangen for many years, and died there on 13 December 1921.

Work on algebraic geometry

Brill and Max Noether developed alternative proofs using algebraic methods for much of Riemann's work on Riemann surfaces. Brill–Noether theory went further by estimating the dimension of the space of maps of given degree d from an algebraic curve to projective space Pn. In birational geometry, Noether introduced the fundamental technique of blowing up in order to prove resolution of singularities for plane curves.

Noether made major contributions to the theory of algebraic surfaces. Noether's formula is the first case of the Riemann-Roch theorem for surfaces. The Noether inequality is one of the main restrictions on the possible discrete invariants of a surface. The Noether-Lefschetz theorem (proved by Lefschetz) says that the Picard group of a very general surface of degree at least 4 in P3 is generated by the restriction of the line bundle O(1).

Noether and Castelnuovo showed that the Cremona group of birational automorphisms of the complex projective plane is generated by the "quadratic transformation"

 [x,y,z] ↦ [1/x, 1/y, 1/z]

together with the group PGL(3,C) of automorphisms of P2. Even today, no explicit generators are known for the group of birational automorphisms of P3.

See also
Infinitely near point
Brill–Noether theory
Noether–Enriques–Petri theorem
Noether's formula
Noether inequality
Noether's theorem on rationality for surfaces
Max Noether's fundamental theorem
Max Noether's theorem on curves

Notes

References
 Dick, Auguste. Emmy Noether: 1882–1935. Boston: Birkhäuser, 1981. .
 Lederman, Leon M. and Christopher T. Hill. Symmetry and the Beautiful Universe. Amherst: Prometheus Books, 2004. .
 Macaulay, Francis S. Max Noether. In: Proceedings of the London Mathematical Society. - 2. ser., vol. 21. - London, 1923. - p. XXXVII-XLII. (online)

External links

 Gabriele Dörflinger: Max Noether. In: Historia Mathematica Heidelbergensis.

1844 births
1921 deaths
19th-century German mathematicians
20th-century German mathematicians
Algebraic geometers
19th-century German Jews
Scientists from Mannheim